The White Rose Cycle Route in Yorkshire, England, part of the National Cycle Network (NCN), was opened by Sustrans in 1998. A map and guide for the route were published in 1999 and 2000.

The route is no longer branded as the White Rose Route.

NCN routes on White Rose route 

Route 1
Route 65
Route 66
Route 71
Route 656
Route 657
Route 658

References

Cycleways in England
Cycling in Yorkshire